The Dubai International Airport Automated People Mover is a driverless people mover located within Dubai International Airport. It operates in two "segments" within Terminal 3 and Concourse A & B, often referred to as the Terminal 3 APM, and between Terminals 1 and Concourse D will referred to as the Terminal 1 APM.

Terminal 3 APM 
The first segment runs between the Terminal 3 and the Airbus A380 dedicated Concourse A. The segment transports departing passengers to their A380 gates, and transports arriving passengers to the passport and immigration section of Terminal 3.
These segment use Mitsubishi Crystal Mover system and opened since January 2013.

Terminal 1 APM 
The second segment of the system runs from the Terminal 1 to Concourse D. These segment will use Bombardier Innovia APM 300.

References 

Passenger rail transport in the United Arab Emirates
Airport people mover systems
Dubai International Airport